Monika Kaelin (born October 13, 1954, in Schwyz, Switzerland) is a model and actress. She was Penthouse Pet of the Month in May 1980.

Life
She worked at the  Ingenbohl monastery in the canton of Schwyz as a trained kindergarten teacher where she used to attend the seminar at the Theresianum secondary school . She also studied singing and violin at the conservatory. She was discovered early on as a photo model. In 1975 she met football idol Fritz Künzli (44 international matches) in a Zurich night club. The couple married on August 24, 1985, later divorced, but stayed together. Kaelin took part in the Grand Prix of Folk Music in 1987. In the 1990s she directed the Bernhard Theater in Zurich. She has been President of the Prix Walo since 1998. Kaelin made several films and was often on musical stages. Künzli died last Sunday at the age of 73 from the consequences of his dementia.

Filmography
 Frauen im Liebeslager(1977)
Mädchen nach Mitternacht(1981)
 S.A.S. à San Salvador (1983)
 Plem, Plem – Die Schule brennt (1983)
Gefährliche Straßen(1991)
Schöni Uussichte - Bienvenidos in Europa(2006)

References

External links
 
 

1954 births
Living people
Swiss female adult models
Swiss film actresses
Penthouse Pets
People from the canton of Schwyz